The McLaren MP4/1 (initially known as the MP4) was a Formula One racing car produced by the McLaren team. It was used during the 1981, 1982 and 1983 seasons. It was the second Formula One car to use a monocoque chassis wholly manufactured from carbon fibre composite, after the Lotus 88 (which never raced), a concept which is now ubiquitous. The MP4/1 was first entered in a Formula One race at the third grand prix of the season in Argentina.

The chassis was designed by John Barnard, Steve Nichols and Alan Jenkins, with the car being powered by a Cosworth DFV engine.

The MP4 was the first car to be built following the merger of the McLaren team and Ron Dennis' Project 4 Formula 2 team; its designation was short for "Marlboro Project 4".

Design and construction
The main engineer for the MP4 was John Barnard, who began drawing the car in late 1979. After a visit to the Rolls-Royce factory where he saw engineers working with carbon fibre technology on the Rolls-Royce RB211 jet engine, Barnard saw the potential of this technology and convinced Ron Dennis to fund the design and build of a whole new car out of this new bodywork material. The chassis itself was built by McLaren using carbon supplied by American firm Hercules Aerospace in Salt Lake City on the advice of McLaren engineer and former Hercules apprentice Steve Nichols, and quickly revolutionised car design in Formula One with new levels of rigidity and driver protection and its Carbon-Fibre-Composite (CFC) construction. Dennis and Barnard took Nichols' advice after being rejected by multiple British firms due to the ambitiousness of this method of chassis construction. Within months and subsequent years carbon fibre started being used by all of McLaren's rivals. The car was far more advanced than any of McLaren's previous cars- including its predecessor, the M29 and M30, and its design and construction was of a far more precise nature than before- just about at the level of fighter aircraft.

From 1981 until late 1983 the MP4/1 was powered by the 3.0 litre Ford-Cosworth DFV V8 engine, but in late 1983 the team switched to turbocharging, using a 1.5 litre TAG V6 engine built by Porsche.

In both 1981 and 1982 McLaren International benefited from the exclusive use of a development Nicholson-McLaren Cosworth DFV which powered the MP4. Developed and re-built in John Nicholson's Colnbrook workshops (an agreement with McLaren going back to the mid-1970s) the Nicholson DFV featured bigger pistons and valves that a conventional factory DFV, and thus could rev to around 11,500 RPM, producing around 510 BHP, enabling John Watson and Niki Lauda to all but match the factory Ferrari and Renault V6 twin-turbos in straight line speed during the 1982 season. The Nicholson DFV also used different castings to reduce frictional losses, as well as using MAHLE pistons rather than Cosworth's in house piston/con rods.

Hercules Aerospace keeps John Watson's car which was destroyed in the 1981 Italian Grand Prix and shows it off to visitors after allowing them to view footage of the accident, highlighting how it was possible for him to survive in a carbon fibre car.

Racing
In 1982, the updated MP4B nearly brought Watson to the World Championship, but he finished third behind Keke Rosberg and Didier Pironi, with 39 points. In the same year, however, it did take second in the Constructors' Championship, collecting 69 points.

For the 1983 season, the car was then updated into the MP4/1C, and the season started with a 1–2 finish for the MP4/1C at Round 2 in Long Beach, in which Watson won from 22nd on the grid – the farthest back on the grid a driver has won from in Formula One – and Lauda finished second from 23rd despite suffering from a worsening leg cramp. This car was used throughout most of the season but against the more powerful turbos of Renault, Ferrari and BMW, results with the outdated Cosworth V8 were becoming harder to come by, though Watson did finish third at the Detroit Grand Prix and the final race for the Cosworth car in Holland.

With Porsche: the MP4/1E 
During the 1983 season, McLaren worked with Techniques d'Avant Garde and Porsche to develop a turbocharged V6 engine built to John Barnard's specifications and the MP4/1D was the test mule. Later in the season at the Dutch Grand Prix at Zandvoort the Cosworth-powered MP4/1C was replaced by the TAG-powered MP4/1E, which was essentially also a test mule that competed in only 4 races; according to Watson in an interview given in 2009 this was a car that was forced into appearing at the Dutch Grand Prix after political maneuvering by Lauda. He went to Marlboro executive Aleardo Buzzi (the man responsible for giving McLaren their primary sponsorship money), behind the back of the McLaren team and complained extensively to Buzzi about the uncompetitiveness of the team without a turbo engine. Buzzi then withheld money that had been committed to McLaren to develop the TAG/Porsche turbo engine. This infuriated Dennis and designer John Barnard, who had designed the MP4/2 specifically for the new turbo-charged engine, but now had to re-design his MP4/1 to "E" spec for the TAG engine.

The MP4/1E was first driven by Watson, not Lauda, at the Porsche proving ground. It was competitive but the new engine was, thanks to Lauda's political maneuvering, underdeveloped and had teething troubles. This made the car very unreliable, and it did not win any races. However, this car was not really expected to win or even finish races. In total, the MP4/1 brought McLaren 6 wins, 11 other podium finishes and a total of 131 points.

BBC commentator Murray Walker drove the MP4/1C at Silverstone in 1983.

The MP4B (listed as the MP4/1B) is available as a classic car in the video game F1 2019.

Complete Formula One World Championship results
(key) (results in bold indicate pole position; results in italics indicate fastest lap)

References

External links 

McLaren MP4 01
1981 Formula One season cars
1983 Formula One season cars